Calcanhar Lighthouse, also known as Touros Lighthouse and formerly named Olhos D'Agua, is an active lighthouse in Touros, Rio Grande do Norte, Brazil. At a height of  it is the nineteenth tallest "traditional lighthouse" in the world, as well as the tallest in Brazil, and one of the tallest concrete lighthouses in the world.

Location
The lighthouse is strategically placed on the beach of the Ponta de Calcanhar, near Touros, where the Brazilian coast forms a right angle, known as “Esquina do Brasil” (corner of Brazil) or "Esquina do Continente" (corner of the continent), near the northern end of the great curve of the cape of São Roque, the northeastern shoulder of South America. A spiral staircase of 277 steps leads to an observation platform; a 21-step ladder leads to the light.

The site also includes several one-story lighthouse keeper's houses and the light station has a resident keeper. The site is open, and the tower is open to the public daily 9 am to 11 am.

See also
List of tallest lighthouses in the world
List of lighthouses in Brazil

Further reading

References

External links

  Centro de Sinalização Náutica Almirante Moraes Rego 

Lighthouses completed in 1912
Lighthouses in Brazil
Buildings and structures in Rio Grande do Norte
Tourist attractions in Rio Grande do Norte
Transport in Rio Grande do Norte
1912 establishments in Brazil